A maxim is simply a moral rule or principle, which can be considered objective or subjective, and dependent on one's philosophy. A maxim is often pedagogical and motivates specific actions. The Oxford Dictionary of Philosophy defines it as:

Deontological ethics

In deontological ethics, mainly in Kantian ethics, maxims are understood as subjective principles of action. A maxim is thought to be part of an agent's thought process for every rational action, indicating in its standard form: (1) the action, or type of action; (2) the conditions under which it is to be done; and (3) the end or purpose to be achieved by the action, or the motive. The maxim of an action is often referred to as the agent's intention. In Kantian ethics, the categorical imperative provides a test on maxims for determining whether the actions they refer to are right, wrong, or permissible.

The categorical imperative is stated canonically as: "Act only according to that maxim whereby you can, at the same time, will that it should become a universal law."

In his Critique of Practical Reason, Immanuel Kant provided the following example of a maxim and of how to apply the test of the categorical imperative:
I have, for example, made it my maxim to increase my wealth by any safe means. Now I have a deposit in my hands, the owner of which has died and left no record of it. . . . I therefore apply the maxim to the present case and ask whether it could indeed take the form of a law, and consequently whether I could through my maxim at the same time give such a law as this: that everyone may deny a deposit which no one can prove has been made. I at once become aware that such a principle, as a law, would annihilate itself since it would bring it about that there would be no deposits at all.

Also, an action is said to have "moral worth" if the maxim upon which the agent acts cites the purpose of conforming to a moral requirement. That is, a person's action has moral worth when he does his duty purely for the sake of duty, or does the right thing for the right reason.  Kant himself believed that it is impossible to know whether anyone's action has ever had moral worth. It might appear to someone that he has acted entirely "from duty", but this could always be an illusion of self-interest: of wanting to see oneself in the best, most noble light. This indicates that agents are not always the best judges of their own maxims or motives.

Personal knowledge
Michael Polanyi in his account of tacit knowledge stressed the importance of the maxim in focusing both explicit and implicit modes of understanding. “Maxims are rules, the correct application of which is part of the art they govern....Maxims can only function within a framework of personal (i.e., experiential) knowledge”.

See also 

 Adage
 Aphorism
 Brocard
 Ethics
 Legal maxim
 Morality
 Paremiology
 Principle

References

External links 
 Locksley Hall - Alfred Lord Tennyson
 Online works of Immanuel Kant at Gutenberg
 Maxims of Action

Concepts in ethics
Kantianism
Statements